The Computers, Freedom and Privacy Conference (or CFP, or the Conference on Computers, Freedom and Privacy) is an annual academic conference held in the United States or Canada about the intersection of computer technology, freedom, and privacy issues. 
The conference was founded in 1991, and since at least 1999, it has been organized under the aegis of the Association for Computing Machinery. It was originally sponsored by CPSR.

CFP91 
The first CFP was held in 1991 in Burlingame, California.

CFP92 
The second CFP was held on March 18–20, 1992 in Washington, DC.  It was the first under the auspices of the Association for Computing Machinery.  The conference chair was Lance Hoffman.  The entire proceedings are available from the Association for Computing Machinery at https://dl.acm.org/doi/proceedings/10.1145/142652.

CFP99 

The Computers, Freedom and Privacy 99 Conference, sponsored by the Association for Computing Machinery, 

the 9th annual CFP, was held in Washington, DC from 6 April 1999 to 8 April 1999.

CFP99 focused on international Internet regulation and privacy protection.

There were close to 500 registered participants and attendees included high-level government officials, grassroots advocates and programmers. 

The conference chair for CFP99 was Marc Rotenberg and the program coordinator was Ross Stapleton-Gray.

Keynote speakers at CFP99 were 
Tim Berners-Lee, director of the World Wide Web Consortium,
Vint Cerf, president of the Internet Society

and 
FTC Commissioner Mozelle Thompson.

Others who spoke at CFP99 included:
David Banisar, policy director at the Electronic Privacy Information Center;
US Representative Bob Barr former federal prosecutor and Georgia Republican;
Colin Bennett, a privacy expert at Canada's University of Victoria;
Paula Breuning, a lawyer for the National Telecommunications and Information Administration in the United States Department of Commerce;
Becky Burr, head of the Commerce Department unit overseeing many Internet issues;
Jason Catlett, privacy advocate and president of JunkBusters;
Scott Charney, head of the United States Department of Justice computer crimes unit;
the artist Henry Cross;
Simon Davies, Fellow of the London School of Economics and representative of Privacy International;
Elizabeth France, head of the UK Data Protection Registrar;
Bob Gellman, privacy consultant;
Peter Hustinx, president of the Dutch Data Protection Authority;
Stephen Lau Ka-men, Hong Kong's Privacy Commissioner for Personal Data;
Jim Lewis from the US Commerce Department's Bureau of Export Administration;
US Representative Ed Markey, a ranking Democrat on the House Subcommittee for Telecommunications, Trade and Consumer Protection;
Erich Moechel from Quintessenz, Austria;
Aryeh Neier, president of the Open Society Institute;
Jagdesh Parikh, an official with Human Rights Watch;
Philip Reitinger, a prosecutor for the US Justice Department;
Carol Risher, vice president of the American Association of Publishers;
Michael Robertson, president of MP3.com;
Cary Scherman, general counsel of the Recording Industry Association of America;
Bruce Schneier, president of Counterpane Systems;
Barbara Simons, president of the Association for Computing Machinery;
David Sobel, legal counsel at the Electronic Privacy Information Center;
Latanya Sweeney, Assistant Professor of Computer Science, Technology and Policy at Carnegie Mellon University;
Peter Swire, chief counselor for privacy in the US Office of Management and Budget;
Greg Taylor of Electronic Frontiers Australia;
Christine Varney, representative of the Online Privacy Alliance and former FTC commissioner;
George Vrandenburg, senior vice president of America Online;
Steve Wright, of the UK-based nonprofit Omega Foundation, author of a report on ECHELON;

Discussion Panels at CFP99 included:
Anonymity and Identity in Cyberspace;
Creation of a Global Surveillance Network;
Global Internet Censorship;
Privacy;
Privacy and data protection policies;
Self Regulation Reconsidered.

Topics covered at CFP99 included:
Anonymity;
Protection of children by parents and teachers, not government;
Fair use of copyrighted material;
Controls over the export of cryptography under the Wassenaar Arrangement;
Data mining and identity theft;
Encryption;
Free speech;
Government disclosure;
Human rights;
The link between privacy and free speech;
Discussion between MP3 activists, musicians and the recording industry;
Privacy and data protection by self-regulation or legislation?;
Proposed privacy legislation;
Self-regulation of online privacy;
Whether the Internet would remain "unfettered and unregulated";

Awards at CFP99 
The first annual US Big Brother Awards were made at CFP99 on Wednesday 7 April 1999, the 50th aniversiary of the publication of George Orwell's Nineteen Eighty-Four. 
The awards were made by the London-based Privacy International to recognize "the government and private sector organizations which have done the most to invade personal privacy in the United States."

Simon Davies, managing director of Privacy International, presented the awards, otherwise known as Orwells. 
There were five categories of award: Greatest Corporate Invader, Lifetime Menace, Most Invasive Program, People's Choice, and Worst Public Official.

At CFP99 Electronic Frontier Foundation made the 1999 EFF Pioneer Awards to Drazen Pantic, Director of OpenNet, Internet provider to Belgrade radio station B92; posthumously to Jon Postel, who ran the Internet Assigned Numbers Authority; and Simon Davies, director of Privacy International.

Announcements at CFP99 

US Representative Edward Markey, (D-Massachusetts) said that to ensure companies post clear and enforcable privacy policies, federal legislation is required, and that he would re-introduce a privacy bill of rights.

At CFP99 Microsoft, the Electronic Frontier Foundation and Truste announced that they had developed a "Privacy Wizard" to assist webmasters create a Privacy Preferences Project statement for their websites.

CFP2000 

The CFP2000 conference chair was Lorrie Faith Cranor.

CFP2005 

The fifteenth iteration of the conference was held in Seattle.  The theme of this conference was equiveillance, the balance between surveillance and sousveillance.  The equiveillance theme was reflected in the Opening Keynote Address, a panel discussion on equiveillance, and a pre-keynote sousveillance workshop, as well as a sousveillance performance. In keeping with this theme, every conference attendee received a sousveillance system consisting of a "maybecamera" attached to each conference bag.  Some of the 500 conference bags contained cameras transmitting live 24/7 video whereas others contained no camera, but merely the familiar camera dome.  A third category of conference bag included some with a subtle but visible flashing red light behind the dome.  Not all of the wireless web cameras had flashing red lights, and some of the flashing red lights were dummy devices that did not transmit video.  The bags that did transmit video also updated various video displays around the conference hall, visible to conference attendees.

CFP2009

CFP2011 

The twenty-first annual CFP Conference in 2011, "Computers, Freedom, and Privacy: The Future is Now", was held at the Georgetown Law Center in Washington, DC June 14–16. Among the questions and issues explored were: What is social media's role in the charged democracy movement in the Middle East and North Africa; How can technology and social media support human rights, What is the impact of mobile personal computing technology on freedom and privacy? Are the courts, policy and decision makers ready to address freedom and privacy in a 24-7 connected world? Are our leaders techs savvy enough to make good legal and policy decisions regarding the deployment of smart grid, e-health records, the spread of consumer location based advertising? Cybersecurity, cloud computing, net neutrality, federated ID, ubiquitous surveillance: Are they passing fads or here to stay?

References

External links 
 Official site

Computer conferences
Recurring events established in 1991
Association for Computing Machinery
Privacy organizations
Privacy in the United States